Luis Saldarriaga (born 22 June 1944) is a Colombian former cyclist. He competed in the team pursuit at the 1968 Summer Olympics.

References

External links
 

1944 births
Living people
Colombian male cyclists
Olympic cyclists of Colombia
Cyclists at the 1968 Summer Olympics
Sportspeople from Medellín
20th-century Colombian people